Manuel Matallana Gómez (25 December 1894 – 1952) was a Spanish officer and lawyer. A son of a military officer, he joined the Spanish army and participated in the Rif War. He supported the Republican government during the Spanish Civil War. In November 1936 he was a member of the general Miaja’s staff during the battle of Madrid. After that, he was promoted to colonel and in July 1937 he was the chief of staff of Miaja during the battle of Brunete, and then later promoted again to general. In February 1939 he said to the prime minister Negrin that it was impossible to continue the war and in March 1939 he joined Casado's coup against the Negrin government. After the end of the war, he was detained and jailed by the Nationalists. Convicted to 30 years imprisonment, Franco granted him a reduced sentence, and by 1941 Matallana was a free man. He died in Madrid in 1952.

Notes

References
Beevor, Antony. The battle for Spain. The Spanish civil war, 1936-1939. Penguin Books. 2006. London.  
Thomas, Hugh. The Spanish Civil War. Penguin Books. 2001. London. 
Jackson, Gabriel. The Spanish Republic and the Civil War, 1931-1939. Princeton University Press. Princeton. 1967.

1894 births
1956 deaths
People from Madrid
Spanish generals
Spanish military personnel of the Spanish Civil War (Republican faction)